Elissa may refer to:
 Elissa (name), a feminine given name (including people by that name)

People
 Dido, Queen of Carthage in Greek and Roman mythology, also referred to as Elissa or Alyssa
 Elissa (singer) (born 1972), Lebanese singer

Other uses
 Elissa (book), a 1900 novel by H. Rider Haggard
 Elissa (ship), a historic sailing ship anchored in Galveston Bay
 Elissa, one of the seven women occurring as narrators in Giovanni Boccaccio's The Decameron